Kalat (also Romanized as Kalāt) is a village in Ruin Rural District, in the Central District of Esfarayen County, North Khorasan Province, Iran. At the 2006 census, its population was 1,372, in 351 families.

References 

Populated places in Esfarayen County